Paul "Jayso" Nuamah Donkor (born June 1, 1983) is a Ghanaian rapper, record producer, singer, songwriter and entrepreneur. After 10 years in the music industry as a rapper and producer, Jayso gained more attention following his work on Sarkodie's second single, Borga, which featured on his debut album, Maakye. Jayso produced over 70 percent of the songs on that album which also shot him into the limelight.

Early life
During Jayso's teenage years at Presbyterian Boys' Senior High School (PRESEC-Legon) he formed Skillions, a critically acclaimed hip hop musical collective whose works not only served as the foundation and springboard for young artists to venture into hip hop, but also introduced locally brewed hip hop to the larger Ghanaian music community. Prior to this, Jayso joined another rapper producer JPE (now Kobi Onyame) with his friends Canz and Mr. Scratch to form the Haatsville Project. This resulted in the release of the Haatsville Project mixtape, which got a lot of people talking about it within the underground hip hop circuits of Ghana.

His current production credits include Sarkodie, M.anifest, Sway, Scientific, Kwaw Kese, Jon Germain, Efya, Rumor and Nigerian MCs Naeto C and Ikechukwu and Gabonese artiste Baponga. On December 10, 2015, he released his debut album titled 'Making Tasha Proud' after over half a decade producing for others.

Early Career/ Music career
Jayso's relationship with music began during his childhood years. During Jayso's High School days at (Presec-Legon) he began to hone his skills first as a rapper and music producer. Prior to joining Haatsville, Jayso was rhyming with his pal T-Kube, who left Ghana for the UK in 2002 while in high school. He, together with JPE (now Kobi Onyame), Canz and Mr. Scratch (the Haatsville crew) put out the Haatsville Project tape. The tape received acclaim among hip hop lovers who were mostly the youth.
Having built on his production knowledge courtesy of his association with Haatsville, Jayso started recruiting what eventually became the first hip hop group Skillions (Skills in a Million). Enlisting Ball J, Jinx Therapy (now Frank P) as the original members of the Skillions, the likes of EL, Midnight, J-Town, KP and Sandyswiz joined the Skillions family.

Under the production supervision of Jayso (who could be described as the Ghanaian version of America's RZA of Skillions) the group released their ground-breaking 21 track debut 'Skillions Demotapes" mixtape in 2002. The recording of the mixtape happened entirely within the makeshift bedroom studio of Jayso. That tape gained a lot of success that led to the whole GH-Rap Movement. The success of the mix tape was largely due to the production works and the style of music; they rapped mostly in English interspersed with pidgin (a Ghanaian version of broken English and local dialects) – which appealed to a large section of the youth. This eventually cemented Skillions' credentials as one of the talented rap groups of their time in Ghana. Even following the disbandment of the group, each Skillionaire is out making a name for himself within the music and arts scene. The breakup of the Skillions allowed them to pursue solo projects and led to Jayso forming another generation of Skillions. The New Generation comprised Lil Shaker, Rumour, Kevin Beats, Graffik, Killmatic, Paapa Versa, Padlock, Sandra, Gemini, Nobel and Joey B. The New Generation under the supervision of Jayso released 'The Skillions New Generation Mixtape' with hit songs such as 'Hood', 'Alert', 'Facebook Girl and Boy", 'I No Dey Biz' under his Skillion Records Imprint.

Jayso has worked with almost every notable artiste within the music sphere in Ghana since 1999. Outside of Ghana, he has worked for one of hip hop legends Wyclef Jean and UK's Sway. Locally, he has produced works for the like of Sarkodie, M.anifest, R2Bees, Efya, Kwaw Kese, Afro Rock Band Dark Suburb, VIP, Reggie Rockstone, ASEM among others.

Discography

Albums
 Making Tasha Proud (2016)
 0106 Vol. 4 (2019)
 0106 Vol. 5 (2020)

EPs
 0106 Vol. 1 (2016)
 0106 Vol. 2 (2017)
 0106 Vol. 3 (2018)
 0106 Vol. 6 (2021)

Collaborative albums
T.M.G (with Sarkodie) (2013)

References

1983 births
Living people
Ghanaian businesspeople
Ghanaian record producers
Ghanaian rappers
21st-century Ghanaian male singers
21st-century Ghanaian singers
Ghanaian male singer-songwriters
Presbyterian Boys' Senior High School alumni